Joseph-Louis Lambot (born 22 May 1814 in Montfort sur Argens; died 2 August 1887 in Brignoles), is the inventor of ferro-cement, which led to the development of what is now known as reinforced concrete. He studied in Paris, where his uncle Baron Lambot was aide-de-camp to the Duke of Bourbon.

In 1841 he moved to his family's estate of Chateau Miraval in the Department of the Var (Southern France), where he applied himself to agriculture. It is around that time that he started constructing water tanks and troughs using cement mortar (masonry) and iron reinforcement most likely in the form of iron rods, chicken wire (which was invented in Britain in 1844 and used for shipping crates) and possibly barrel bands that were easily available with the arrival of the machine age. In 1848 he constructed his first boat using the same system, which he tested on ponds on the estate. This boat was patented  on 30 January 1855 and presented at the 1855 World's Fair in Paris (Exposition Universelle - 1855). Unfortunately, his patents went no further and were superseded by patents of Joseph Monier. Robert Courland describes in his book Concrete Planet that Lambot's boat sank and was preserved in anaerobic mud at the bottom of the lake. The boat was recovered more than a hundred years later.

His birthplace in Montfort-sur-Argens is now "Maison Lambot" BnB.

References

Museum of Brignoles

External links

1814 births
1887 deaths
19th-century French engineers
French materials scientists
Concrete pioneers
19th-century French inventors